"Hold You Down" is a song recorded by American singer Jennifer Lopez for her fourth studio album, Rebirth (2005). Written by Gregory "Nyce Boy" Christopher, Makeba Riddick, Fat Joe (who is also the featured artist), Cory Rooney, Gregory Bruno and produced by Christopher, Bruno and Rooney, "Hold You Down" hit number 6 on the United Kingdom's singles chart, and was a Top 40 hit in many other countries. "Hold You Down" samples Shirley Murdock's 1986 song "As We Lay" which was written by Larry Troutman of the funk band Zapp, and keyboardist Billy Beck of Ohio Players

The song is the third collaboration between Lopez and Joe, after "Feelin' So Good" (1999) with Big Pun, and "Love Don't Cost a Thing (RJ Schoolyard Mix)" (2002). They teamed up once again in 2014 on Joe's song "Stressin'".

Background 
After the moderate success of Rebirths lead single "Get Right", "Hold You Down" was chosen as its second single. Critics and fans alike criticized this move, considering the general lukewarm reception of the song. "Hold You Down" was also included on Fat Joe's album All or Nothing (2005). A remix with Don Omar is included on his compilation album Da Hitman Presents Reggaetón Latino (2005).

Composition 
"Hold You Down" is a song with a length of four minutes and thirty-two seconds (4:32). The song samples Shirley Murdock's "As We Lay". According to Lopez, the track was a "last minute" add to Rebirth. While listening to the song, she knew that "there's nobody" that she can do the song with "except Fat Joe". Lopez called Fat Joe up immediately and the next day, the song was recorded after he created his own rap verses.

Describing the lyrics for "Hold You Down", Fat Joe said, "It's more like a friendship record, you know what I mean? Growing up in the Bronx and how we became who we are, but we still keep it real with each other. We don't talk every day, but we got mad love for each other whenever we see each other. It's always crazy love." According to Entertainment Weekly, the song is about "how true she's [Lopez] been to her hood." "Hold You Down" consists of a flat beat and "some tinkling" chimes in the background, which according to Sam Shepherd from musicOMH, "wouldn't be out of place on a Christmas single."

Critical response 
The song received most mixed reviews from music critics. musicOMH's Sam Shepherd wrote, "The lyrics are sweet but not sickly so, and Fat Joe's appearance doesn't sound like he's co-opted the track - instead he allows Lopez's voice room to breathe; and who would have guessed it, she may have an asset that is more impressive than her booty."

Mike Schiller from PopMatters called it "ill-fated" and "milquetoast". David Browne of Entertainment Weekly commented that "even with Fat Joe pitching in, the song is as colorless as Lopez's voice."

Music video 
Prior to the video's release, Lopez told MTV News that "I'll be very real". The music video for "Hold You Down" was directed by Diane Martel and edited by Paul Martínez. It was released on March 7, 2005. In The Bronx, New York City, Lopez is seen singing on top of a building and in a hallway, while Fat Joe is seen roaming the streets.

Track listings

Australian CD maxi single
"Hold You Down" featuring Fat Joe (Radio Edit) — 3:55
"Hold You Down" featuring Fat Joe (Cory Rooney Spring Mix) — 4:51
"Hold You Down" featuring Don Omar (The Eliel Mix) — 4:02
"Hold You Down" featuring Don Omar (SPK and DJ Lobo Remix) — 3:59

European CD single
"Hold You Down" featuring Fat Joe (Radio Edit) — 3:55
"Hold You Down" featuring Fat Joe (Cory Rooney Spring Clean Mix) — 4:51

European CD maxi single
"Hold You Down" featuring Fat Joe (Album Version) — 4:36
"Hold You Down" featuring Don Omar (The Eliel Mix) — 4:02
"Hold You Down" featuring Don Omar (SPK and DJ Lobo Remix) — 3:59
"Get Right" featuring Fabolous (Hip Hop Remix) — 3:47
"Hold You Down" featuring Fat Joe (Video)

European 12" vinyl
"Hold You Down" featuring Fat Joe (Cory Rooney Spring Clean Edit Mix) — 4:22
"Hold You Down" featuring Fat Joe (Cory Rooney Spring Instrumental Mix) — 4:51
"Hold You Down" featuring Fat Joe (Album Version) — 4:36
"Hold You Down" featuring Don Omar (The Eliel Mix) — 4:02
"Hold You Down" featuring Don Omar (SPK and DJ Lobo Remix) — 3:59
"Hold You Down" featuring Don Omar (The Eliel Instrumental Mix) — 4:02

US 12-inch vinyl
"Hold You Down" featuring Fat Joe (Album Version) — 4:36
"Hold You Down" (Instrumental) — 4:36

12-inch vinyl (Remixes)
"Hold You Down" featuring Fat Joe (Cory Rooney Spring Edit Mix) — 4:22
"Hold You Down" featuring Fat Joe (Cory Rooney Spring Instrumental Mix) — 4:51
"Hold You Down" featuring Don Omar (SPK and DJ Lobo Remix) — 3:59
"Hold You Down" featuring Don Omar (The Eliel Mix) — 4:02

Charts

Weekly charts

Year-end charts

Release history

References

External links
 

2000s ballads
2005 singles
2005 songs
Contemporary R&B ballads
Don Omar songs
Epic Records singles
Fat Joe songs
Hip hop soul songs
Jennifer Lopez songs
Music videos directed by Diane Martel
Pop ballads
Reggaeton songs
Song recordings produced by Cory Rooney
Songs written by Cory Rooney
Songs written by Fat Joe
Songs written by Larry Troutman
Songs written by Makeba Riddick

he:Rebirth#Hold You Down